"It's the End of the World" is the 16th episode of the second season of the ABC series, Grey's Anatomy. The episode was written by series creator Shonda Rhimes and directed by co-executive producer Peter Horton. This episode is the first of a two-part story, concluding its plot on the following episode, "As We Know It". It originally aired on February 5, 2006, serving as the lead-out program for Super Bowl XL. On its original broadcast, "It's the End of the World" was watched by 38.1 million viewers. It is the highest rated and most watched episode of the series.

The episode, along with its second part, secured writer Shonda Rhimes a 58th Primetime Emmy Awards nomination in the Outstanding Writing for a Drama Series category.

Plot
The episode begins with a scene of Izzie, Cristina, Meredith, and George in the shower together. It's George's dream. George wakes up to find that Meredith refuses to go to work as she has this feeling that she will die. George and Izzie cannot get her out of bed; they have to call in Cristina. Once all 4 are at the hospital, the premonition seems to have some validity. At the same time that Dr. Bailey returns, solo, to have her baby at the hospital (she tells them that her husband is on his way by car), a severely injured male trauma victim and his hysterical, screaming wife are brought in by paramedics; one of the paramedics, Hannah (played by guest star Christina Ricci), has her hand inside the victim's chest cavity to stop the bleeding. They are whisked to the surgical wing with Dr. Burke attending. Alex is ordered to stay and calm the wife, which he accomplishes by screaming back at her, shocking her into sense, and soon discovers that Hannah's hand is not the only thing inside of this patient; after firing a homemade bazooka, the husband has a piece of unexploded ammunition inside of him. The hospital goes on Code Black, for bomb in building, which essentially shuts down the surgical wing—save for the one operation that has already begun: Derek and Cristina operating on the brain of a man who they discovered is Bailey's husband. Meanwhile, Bailey refuses to have her baby until her husband arrives, not knowing he already had and was in surgery.
Bailey's husband got into a car accident trying to get to the hospital on time. The interns discover this when George calls the husband's phone at Bailey's request, and Izzie picks it up out of the man's belongings. They opt not to tell Bailey until Derek is clear on prognosis. The bomb squad, led by Dylan Young (played by guest star Kyle Chandler), wants to clear out the ORs of all unnecessary personnel. Derek, Cristina, and Meredith all insist on staying. Shortly after, Izzie and George chat about being "doers versus watchers" (they feel Cristina and Meredith  are the "doers"), and then Izzie decides to ignite things with Alex—in the supply closet. Richard is trying his best to keep the hospital in some sort of order amidst the chaos, but he's having a tough time. In the surgical wing, the anesthesiologist quietly trains Hannah in providing airflow for the patient and then flees the OR, leaving Hannah alone with the patient and the bomb while all the other doctors are strategizing with Dylan. Meredith finds Hannah having a nervous breakdown, about to pull her hand out and potentially put them all in danger (and kill the patient, whose bleeding she is suppressing). Hannah does pull her hand out and flee the scene—but not before Meredith can take her place as the person with her hand in the patient.

Title reference
The episode's title refers to the song "It's the End of the World as We Know It (And I Feel Fine)" by R.E.M., whose lead singer, Michael Stipe, collaborated with Coldplay frontman Chris Martin for a cover of the Joseph Arthur song "In The Sun", which closes the episode.

Music
"Dead Streets" - The Monotypes
"Miniature Disasters" - KT Tunstall
"Kaboom!" - Ursula 1000
"In the Sun" - Michael Stipe & Chris Martin

Reception

Wetpaint named it in December 2011 one of the 5 best episodes of Grey's Anatomy along with the second part "As We Know It".

Medical YouTuber Doctor Mike went over the two-parter highlighting all of the medical mistakes as well as the completely unrealistic actions of the bomb squad leader, calling him "the most useless bomb squad person ever".

References

External links
 

2006 American television episodes
Grey's Anatomy (season 2) episodes
Super Bowl lead-out shows